Isand is a 2015 Estonian animated film directed by Riho Unt and based on the novel "Popi and Huhuu" by Friedebert Tuglas.

Plot

Awards
 2015: Annecy International Animation Film Festival (France), the jury Grand Prix
 2016: annual award by Cultural Endowment of Estonia (best film of the year)
 2016: Estonian Film Journalists' Association's award: Neitsi Maali award (best film of the year)

References

External links
 
 Isand, entry in Estonian Film Database (EFIS)

2015 films
Estonian animated films